Zweidlen railway station is a railway station in the Swiss canton of Zürich and municipality of Glattfelden. It is located on the Winterthur to Koblenz line, and is served by Zürich S-Bahn line S36.

The station is also the loading point for trains carrying gravel from the nearby works of Weiacher Kies AG.

Services
 the following services stop at Zweidlen:

Gallery

References

External links
 
 

Zweidlen
Zweidlen
Glattfelden